Triple Crown Productions was an ad hoc production company that produced the series of Triple Crown races for thoroughbred horses.

History

Formation
In 1985, a group of people wanted to increase the stature of the Triple Crown on television. Other than the Kentucky Derby, the Preakness Stakes and Belmont Stakes were considered the two "other" races. ABC Sports, which had broadcast the Derby since 1975, wanted to televise all the races as a three race package. CBS Sports, which showed the other two races, had much lower ratings for them, with the possible exceptions of years in which the Crown was at stake like 1973, 1977, and 1978.

In 1977, ABC was awarded the contract to televise the Preakness. TCP was formed in 1985 after CBS terminated its contract with NYRA. ABC Sports won the rights to broadcast all three races, as well as many prep races. Ratings went up after the package was centralized.

Unified Triple Crown nominations

Triple Crown Publications was charged with marketing the Kentucky Derby, the Preakness Stakes and the Belmont Stakes as a single entity. Incorporated in September 1985, Triple Crown Productions opened its offices at Churchill Downs in January 1986 and inaugurated a common nomination form and fees for all three races. Early nominations were set at a fee of $600 for each horse nominated at the closing of mid-January and late nominations for $3,000 (now $6,000) closing six weeks prior to the Derby. Supplemental entries were also set at $150,000 for the Derby and $100,000 for the Preakness and Belmont if nominating a horse after the second nomination close.

Chrysler Triple Crown Bonus

In 1986 Triple Crown Productions in an effort to get more publicity for the three race series sought a sponsor. The very next year, beginning in 1987, Chrysler Motors agreed to offer a three tiered bonus called the "Chrysler Triple Crown Challenge" and a "Triple Crown Bonus." The first two phases of the bonus would have two distinct payouts to the owners of horses running in the Triple Crown series.

The first part of the bonus would be paid out to any horse that could sweep all three legs of the Triple Crown. That bonus brought the combined purse winnings of all three race purses and the extra series bonus to equal $5,000,000 to the winner along with the special Triple Crown Trophy commissioned by the Thoroughbred Racing Association. A second phase of the bonus was to be paid out as a flat $1,000,000 to any horse that started and finished in all three races and had the highest combined total finish. The requirement to "finish all three races" affected the 1993 result, as Sea Hero was declared the winner in 1993 despite Prairie Bayou ending up with more points, as Prairie Bayou broke down during the Belmont Stakes and failed to finish.

Chrysler also offered a third phase to the "Triple Crown Challenge." The automobile company offered a bonus and showcased its vehicles in track infields and on network television, and gave away a new Chrysler vehicle to the winning jockey of every Triple Crown race. If the same jockey won a second race during the same annual series then the Chrysler vehicle would be given to the winning trainer. The $5,000,000 Triple Crown bonus was never paid, as there were no Triple Crown winners between 1978 and 2014.

Triple Crown Challenge Points

An enduring feature of the Challenge was the establishment of a point system to determine which horse had the highest combined Triple Crown total finish. Points were awarded equally in all three Triple Crown races. Ten points were earned by a win. Five points were earned by a place finish, three points were earned for a show finish and one point was awarded to a fourth-place finish. The horse that earned the highest number of points and started in all three races was awarded the million dollars. See table below for Highest combined Triple Crown finish in each year since 1987. The $1,000,000 bonus was discontinued after seven years.

In the first year of the challenge, a win was worth five points, second was worth three, third was worth one, and no points were awarded for fourth. Had the system used in later years been in effect, Alysheba's two firsts and a fourth (21 points) would have been enough to beat Bet Twice's two seconds and a first (20 points), but under the original system, Bet Twice had 11 points to Alysheba's 10.

Highest combined Triple Crown finish

This is a listing of the horses that finished in either first, second, third, or fourth in the Triple Crown Challenge, based on finishes in all three legs of the United States Triple Crown of Thoroughbred Racing.

Visa Triple Crown Bonus

In 1996, as Chrysler ended its association as sponsor of the Triple Crown, Visa stepped in. Carl Pascarella, president of Visa, a horse owner himself, took the relationship far beyond where it was during the Chrysler era. Visa looked upon the sponsorship as a true partnership. In the winter and spring, Visa produced and aired television commercials focusing on its sponsorship of the three grade I races comprising the Triple Crown, the Kentucky Derby, the Preakness Stakes and the Belmont Stakes, and then increased the marketing budget dramatically following the Preakness if a horse was eligible to win the Visa Triple Crown Challenge. Visa helped market racing in ways that racing could not afford to do on its own.

In addition to the mass marketing campaign, Visa changed the bonus dramatically. The second and third phases of the bonus were discontinued. The first phase of the bonus was changed from supplementing the purses to equal five million dollars to a flat payment of $5,000,000. in addition to the race purses. That would mean that the winning connections would earn between $1,800,000 to $2,460,000 for the race purses and add an additional $5,000,000. to that to bring a combined purse up to a $7,000,000. range. Pascarella dearly wanted to hand out the $5-million bonus that goes with a sweep of the Triple Crown, and in six of Visa's nine years there was that possibility.

On May 21, 2005, the Visa credit card company withdrew its sponsorship of the Triple Crown, effective in 2006. It relieved Visa of paying the $5 million bonus to the owner of a horse that won the Triple Crown. Triple Crown Productions has sponsored the races since 2006.

Many believe Visa withdrew its sponsorship as a result of the New York Racing Association's decision to break with the other two tracks on a television contract. On October 4, 2004, NYRA announced that the American Broadcasting Company and ESPN would hold television rights to the Belmont Stakes, breaking from Triple Crown Productions' deal with NBC Sports.[1] NBC Sports holds the broadcasting rights to the Kentucky Derby and Preakness Stakes until 2010. During the entire bonus period no bonus had been paid out since there still has been no Triple Crown winner since 1978. When the NYRA deal ended in 2010, Comcast acquired rights for all three races, in separate contracts, to air on their channels. The Comcast deal is a five-year deal from 2011 to 2015.

Later years
Combined broadcast arrangements with ABC continued until 2001, when NBC Sports took over. Under NBC, ratings continued to go up, by as much as 20 percent in some years. It did not hurt that many horses, like Funny Cide and Smarty Jones, were making Triple Crown runs during those years (although all of them failed). From 2002 to 2004, the Belmont had the highest ratings of any horse race on television.

After the 2004 race, the New York Racing Association ended its deal with NBC, citing a conflict over profit-sharing arrangements. ABC won the rights to the Belmont, and TCP was effectively dissolved related to bonuses and broadcast rights. The only function that Triple Crown Production still oversees is joint nomination fees and a small joint marketing effort.

In 2011, NBC Sports once again became the broadcaster of all three Triple Crown races in separate broadcast deals; including an extension to its existing rights to the Kentucky Derby and Preakness Stakes, plus establishing a new 5-year deal to broadcast the Belmont Stakes after ABC and ESPN declined to renew their previous contract. All three deals last through 2015, and include supplementary coverage on NBC Sports Network for all three races. The additional coverage included 14-1/2 hours of Kentucky Derby pre-race coverage including an hour and a half live special for the Kentucky Oaks and six and a half hours of Preakness Stakes pre-race coverage including a one-hour live special on the Black-Eyed Susan Stakes, both carried on NBC Sports Network.

References

 ^ Thoroughbred Times, Racing Almanac (Annual 2005). "Triple Crown Productions" page 117.
 ^ Liebman, Bennett (April 24, 2008). "Origins of Triple Crown". The Rail: The Race for the Triple Crown (New York, NY: The New York Times). http://therail.blogs.nytimes.com/2008/04/24/origins-of-triple-crown/. Retrieved on May 9, 2009.

Productions
ABC Sports
NBC Sports
American companies established in 1985
Horse racing on television
Kentucky Derby
Preakness Stakes
Belmont Stakes